Sir Thomas Mackworth, 4th Baronet (died 1745) of Normanton Hall, Rutland, was a British landowner and politician who sat in the English House of Commons between 1694 and 1708 and in the British House of Commons between 1713 and 1727. He was a speculator in mining.

Biography
Mackworth was the only surviving son of Sir Thomas Mackworth, 3rd Baronet and his second wife, Anne Mackworth, daughter of Col. Humphrey Mackworth, of Betton, Shropshire. His father died in November 1694 and he succeeded to his estates, his seat in Parliament and the baronetcy.

Mackworth was returned unopposed as Member of Parliament for Rutland  at a by-election on 17 December 1694 following the death of his father. He did not stand for election in 1695 but was High Sheriff of Rutland for the year 1696 to 1697. At the first general election in 1701, Mackworth was returned unopposed as MP for Rutland and was returned again in the second general election of 1701, 1702 and 1705. He did not stand in the general elections in 1708 and 1710.

He became involved with his cousin Sir Humphrey Mackworth in mining and smelting ventures in south Wales and acted as a partner when Sir Humphrey bought some lead mines formerly owned by Sir Carbery Pryse, 4th Baronet. When the Company of Mine Adventurers was floated in 1698. He was a director of the company from the outset. 

In 1704, the Company of Mine Adventurers received a Royal Charter, but by 1710 was running into financial difficulties which resulted in a parliamentary enquiry. Mackworth pleaded lack of financial expertise and lack of involvement in the decisions that led to failure, but was debarred from being a Director of the Company.

At the 1713 general election he was returned on behalf of the administration as MP for Portsmouth, but did not stand for Parliament in 1715. It was said in 1716 that he had profited greatly by shrewd investments at the time of the Jacobite rebellion. He invested further in the Company of Mine Adventurers, of which he became a Director again in 1721. He was returned unopposed for Rutland as a Tory at a by-election on 5 April 1721 and headed the poll in 1722. 

However, he was ruined financially by the cost of this contest and his estates including Normanton Hall were sold by order of the court of Chancery to pay his debts,  He did not stand at the 1727 general election. On a visit to Paris in 1729 he expressed strong pro-Jacobite sentiments.

Private life
Mackworth died unmarried at Kentish Town in North London in February 1745, leaving most of his property to his sisters, and the baronetcy passed to a cousin, Thomas Mackworth, an apothecary in Huntingdon. He also left some property in trust for a supposed illegitimate son, Thomas Mackworth.

References

1745 deaths
British MPs 1708–1710
British MPs 1710–1713
British MPs 1715–1722
British MPs 1722–1727
British MPs 1727–1734
Members of the Parliament of Great Britain for English constituencies
Baronets in the Baronetage of England